In Albania, the Prosecutor General is the highest judicial authority exercising the criminal prosecution of entities or individuals and representing the accusation in court on behalf of the state. They are also responsible for carrying out a series of other duties assigned by law to the prosecution.

The General Prosecutor proposes to the President of the Republic the candidates for prosecutor after considering the opinion of the Council of Prosecution. They are entitled to issue orders for the prosecutor's suspension from exercise of their duty when the starting of a criminal proceeding against them has been decided, until the end of the proceeding, or when a serious disciplinary violation is uncovered.

In the exercise of their competencies, prosecutors operate in accordance with the Constitution and laws. 
They exert their competencies by respecting the principles of fair, equal and legal proceedings and safeguarding human rights, interests and legal freedoms.

The Prosecution is organized and working under the direction of the General Prosecutor as a centralized structure, composed of the Office of the General Prosecutor, the Council of the Prosecution and the prosecutors of the judiciary system.

Prosecutors

References